George William Carey (November 4, 1892 – December 31, 1974) was a Canadian ice hockey right winger. He was born in Montreal, Quebec to Scottish parents. He first played professionally with the Quebec Bulldogs in the National Hockey Association, playing one game for them in the 1911–12 season and winning the Stanley Cup in 1912. He played amateur hockey for several years after that before returning to the Bulldogs in 1916–17, and spent one final season with the team in 1919–20 when they were in the National Hockey League. The team moved and became the Hamilton Tigers in 1920 and Carey spent two seasons and part of a third there, spending a partial season with the Calgary Tigers of the Western Canada Hockey League before one final year in the NHL with the Toronto St. Pats, retiring in 1924. He died in 1974 and was buried at Prospect Cemetery in Toronto.

Career statistics

Regular season and playoffs

References

External links

1892 births
1974 deaths
Anglophone Quebec people
Calgary Tigers players
Canadian ice hockey right wingers
Canadian people of Scottish descent
Hamilton Tigers (ice hockey) players
Ice hockey people from Montreal
Quebec Bulldogs (NHA) players
Quebec Bulldogs players
Stanley Cup champions
Toronto St. Pats players